Firas Kashosh (born 10 January 1976 in Hama, Syria) is a Syrian footballer. He currently plays for Al-Taliya, who play in the Syrian Premier League, which is the top division in Syria. He plays as a striker, wearing the shirt with number 99 for Al-Taliya.

Club career
Kashosh's career began with the Al-Taliya youth team, he went later to Al-Shorta Damascus and Al-Shorta Hama.

He finished as top scorer in the 2009–10 Syrian Premier League season with 15 goals.

Since June 2010 Kashosh was loaned to Shihan for two months. Shihan played in the Jordan League second Division.
But after two games for Shihan he returned to Al-Taliya.

Honour and Titles

Club 
Al-Taliya
Syrian Cup: 2007 Runner-up

Individual
 Syrian League Top Goalscorer: 2010  (15 goals)

References

External links 
 Career stats at Kooora.com (Arabic)
 Career stats at goalzz.com

1976 births
Living people
People from Hama
Association football forwards
Syrian footballers
Taliya SC players
Al-Shorta Damascus players
Syrian expatriate footballers
Expatriate footballers in Jordan
Syrian expatriate sportspeople in Jordan
Syrian Premier League players